The 2008–09 Ethiopian Premier League is the season of the Ethiopian Premier League since its establishment in 1944. A total of 16 teams are contesting the league, with Saint-George SA the defending champions for the twenty-second time in total.

Table and results

League table

Teams and stadiums  

Premiere League
Premiere League
Ethiopian Premier League
Ethiopian Premier League